Juncus pelocarpus, the brown-fruit rush, is a species of flowering plant in the family Juncaceae, native to British Columbia and eastern Canada, and the north-central and eastern United States.

References

pelocarpus
Flora of British Columbia
Flora of Eastern Canada
Flora of Minnesota
Flora of Wisconsin
Flora of the Northeastern United States
Flora of the Southeastern United States
Plants described in 1823